The Penelakut First Nation is the band government of the Penelakut people on Vancouver Island in British Columbia, Canada.

Member governments
The six tribes of The Penelakut First Nation are Chemainus First Nation, Cowichan Tribes, Halalt First Nation, Lake Cowichan First Nation, Lyackson First Nation, and Penelakut Tribe. 
All of the member tribes speak the Hul'qumi'num language.

Treaty Process

History

Demographics
INAC number, 650 the Penelakut has 859 members.

Economic Development

Social, Educational and Cultural Programs and Facilities

See also

List of tribal councils in British Columbia
 Government of Canada Aboriginal Portal

References

First Nations governments in British Columbia
Coast Salish governments